Leonard Gates (born November 26, 1970) is an American professional darts player who competes in the Professional Darts Corporation (PDC) events. He is the current PDC North American champion. He is also a former baseball player, playing for Abilene Prairie Dogs, Massachusetts Mad Dogs, Catskill Cougars and Nashua Pride.

Career
Gates started to play in WDF in 2007, winning numerous American darts tournaments, including exhibition ones. His first appearance in major BDO tournament was in 2017 World Masters, where he lost in the last 272 to Paul Coughlin.

In 2022, Gates qualified as a seed for the 2022 WDF World Darts Championship, but he lost in the second round to Steve Hine of England.

In June, Gates took part in the 2022 US Darts Masters, where he was one of the eight North American qualifiers. He defeated Fallon Sherrock 6–2 in the first round before losing to Peter Wright 3–8 in the quarter-finals. At the same time, he played in the 2022 PDC North American Championship, where he went on to defeat Jules van Dongen and David Cameron, before beating Danny Baggish in the final and securing his first PDC title, which meant he qualified for the 2023 PDC World Darts Championship and 2022 Grand Slam of Darts as well.

In September, Gates took a part in the 2022 World Series of Darts Finals, where he reached the second round, defeating Devon Petersen 6–4 in the first round and then, however, losing to James Wade 4–6 in the next one.

Also apart from steeltip darts, Gates plays in darts tournaments of the World Soft Darts Association (WSDA) as well, being the one of the most popular soft-tip contenders.

World Championship results

WDF
 2022: Second round (lost to Steve Hine 0–3)

PDC
 2023: Second round (lost to Stephen Bunting 1–3)

WSDT
 2023: Semi-finals (lost to Richie Howson 1–3)

References

External links

Leonard Gates player profile at Darts Orakel

1970 births
Living people
Sportspeople from Houston
Baseball players from Houston
American darts players
Abilene Prairie Dogs players
Massachusetts Mad Dogs players
Catskill Cougars players
Nashua Pride players